Olga Bumbić (born 4 September 1946) is a Yugoslav gymnast. She competed at the 1972 Summer Olympics.

References

External links
 

1946 births
Living people
Yugoslav female artistic gymnasts
Olympic gymnasts of Yugoslavia
Gymnasts at the 1972 Summer Olympics
Place of birth missing (living people)